Bettina Inés Romero (born 19 July 1978) is an Argentine lawyer and politician, currently serving as mayor of Salta. She is the first woman to hold the post in the city's history.

She is part of a renown political family in Salta Province; her father is former governor of Salta Province Juan Carlos Romero, himself the son of another governor, Roberto Romero.

Early life
Bettina Inés Romero was born on 19 July 1978 in Salta, daughter of Juan Carlos Romero and Carmen Marcuzzi. She was born into a renown political family: Juan Carlos was governor of Salta Province and currently serves as a National Senator, both positions also held by his father, Roberto Romero (1927–1922).

She studied law at the Universidad de Belgrano, later completing a master's degree on South American political economy from Georgetown University.

Political career
Romero began her political activism in various NGOs. She served as director for the Argentine Northwest Region of the Ministry of Social Development during the government of President Mauricio Macri. In 2017, she was elected to the Chamber of Deputies of Salta in the Capital Department as part of the Salta Nos Une ("Salta Unites Us") list. In November 2017, she was elected as the lower chamber's representative to the Salta Province Council of Magistracy.

In 2019, she ran for mayor of the City of Salta, hoping to succeed Gustavo Sáenz, whose successful gubernatorial candidacy she supported. She won the Salta Nos Une primaries in August, and later, in November, she won the mayorship with 52.6% of the vote against the Frente de Todos candidate, David Leiva.

Personal life
Romero is married to wine merchant Francisco Lavaque, with whom she has three children.

Electoral history

Executive

Legislative

References

External links

 
Municipality of Salta 

1978 births
Living people
People from Salta
Mayors of Salta
Women mayors of places in Argentina
Georgetown University alumni
Argentine women lawyers
Members of the Chamber of Deputies of Salta
21st-century Argentine politicians
21st-century Argentine women politicians